Zhongning Road is a station that is part of Line 14 of the Shanghai Metro. Located at the intersection of Zhongning Road and Wuning Road in the city's Putuo District, the station opened with the rest of Line 14 on December 30, 2021.

References 

Railway stations in Shanghai
Shanghai Metro stations in Putuo District
Line 14, Shanghai Metro
Railway stations in China opened in 2021